Mizoram College of Nursing is a nursing college run by Civil Hospital, Aizawl under the Health & Family Welfare Department, Mizoram, India.

Campus
The campus is located in Falkawn. The foundation stone was laid on 24 January 2011. It features a library, computer lab, nursing lab, classrooms, and a hostel. It has 22 teaching staff and 29 non teaching staff.

History
The school began in 1980 with an intake of 20 students for the general nursing and midwifery course. About 500 students have graduated since then. The institution was upgraded to provide degree level education in 2005.

Course
The college offers a B.Sc.Nursing course.

Affiliation
The institution has gained approval from the Indian Nursing Council (INC), Delhi and Mizoram Nursing Council (MNC), Aizawl. It is affiliated with Mizoram University.

See also
Education in India
Education in Mizoram
Mizoram University
Literacy in India

References

External links

Universities and colleges in Mizoram
Colleges affiliated to Mizoram University
Nursing schools in India
Education in Aizawl